Harold Ira Panken (July 17, 1910 – March 1999) was an American lawyer and State Senator from New York.

Life
He was born on July 17, 1910, in Manhattan, New York City, the son of Abraham Panken (born 1878). He attended the public schools and high schools. He graduated B.Sc. from New York University; and J.D. from New York University School of Law. He practiced law in New York City. In 1934, he married Sylvia, and they had three sons, Peter, Bruce, and Jeffery.

Panken was a member of the New York State Senate (21st D.) from 1947 to 1952, sitting in the 166th, 167th and 168th New York State Legislatures. In August 1952, he ran for re-election in the Democratic primary with the backing of Tammany Hall, but was defeated by Julius A. Archibald.

He died in March 1999.

Sources

1910 births
1999 deaths
Democratic Party New York (state) state senators
People from Manhattan
New York University School of Law alumni
20th-century American politicians